Pablo Trapero (born 4 October 1971) is an Argentine film producer, editor, and director. He is considered to be a big creative force in Latin American cinema.

Biography 
Pablo Trapero was born in San Justo, Argentina in 1971. In 1999 he directed his first feature, Mundo Grúa, which won the Critics Prize at Venice.

In 2002, he opened his production company, Matanza Cine, that produces films for fellow filmmakers, as well as his own. His second feature, El Bonaerense (2002) premiered at Cannes, Familia Rodante (2004) at Venice, and Nacido y Criado (2006) at Toronto.

In 2008, Leonera, presented in Competition at Cannes, showcased the talent of Martina Gusman, muse, actress and producer of the cineaste. He returned to Cannes with Carancho (2010) and Elefante Blanco (2012), both in Un Certain Regard. His films have been covered in some of the most important festivals, receiving critical acclaim and awards.

He has sat on the main festival juries at Venice, San Sebastian and Locarno, among others. In 2014 he served as President of Un Certain Regard in Cannes. In 2015 the Ministry of Culture of France awarded him Chevallier l'Ordre des Arts et des Lettres, becoming the first South American director in receiving this honor.

With his film, The Clan, he won the Silver Lion for Best Director in Venice International Film Festival.

Filmography
Director, Scriptwriter and Producer
 Mundo Grúa (1999)
 El Bonaerense (2002)
 Familia Rodante (2004)
 Nacido y Criado (2006)
 Leonera (2008), released in the U.S. as Lion's Den
 Carancho (2010)
 White Elephant (2012)
 The Clan (2015)
 La Quietud (2018)

Director Only
 Mocoso malcriado (1993)
 Negocios (1995)
 Naikor, La Estación de Servicio (2001)

Producer Only
 La Libertad (2001)
 La Mecha (2003)
 Ciudad de María (2002)
 Mi Mejor Enemigo (2005)
 Dí Buen Día a Papá (2005)
 Géminis (2005)

Television

 Ensayo (2003) - TV series
ZeroZeroZero (2020) - TV series
Echo 3 (2023) - TV series

References

External links
 

1971 births
Argentine film directors
Argentine film producers
Argentine screenwriters
Male screenwriters
Argentine male writers
Living people
People from La Matanza Partido
Venice Best Director Silver Lion winners